Veøy is a former municipality in Møre og Romsdal county, Norway. The  municipality existed from 1838 until its dissolution in 1964. It initially consisted of all of the present-day Vestnes Municipality, as well as the southern part of Molde Municipality and the northern part of Rauma Municipality. Vestnes Municipality was only part of Veøy for a few months in 1838 before it was made into a separate municipality. In 1964, the municipality was split between Molde and Rauma municipalities. Veøy Municipality was named after the island of Veøya, the administrative centre, where the main church for the municipality (Old Veøy Church) was located. There are no inhabitants on the island of Veøya (as of 2020).

Name
The island and municipality was named Veøy. It was the religious center of the whole Romsdal region and the name is a compound of vé which means "sanctuary" and øy which means "island", thus a holy island.  The name was historically spelled Veø.

History

The parish of Veøy was established as a municipality on 1 January 1838 (see formannskapsdistrikt law). The western district of Veøy was separated in the fall of 1838 to become Vestnes Municipality. During the 1960s, there were many municipal mergers across Norway due to the work of the Schei Committee. On 1 January 1964, the islands of Sekken and Veøya as well as the Nesjestranda district on the mainland north of the Langfjorden (with a total population of 756) were incorporated into the newly enlarged Molde Municipality. The remainder of Veøy on the south side of the Langfjorden and the Vågstranda area (population: 1,400) were merged with the small municipalities of Eid, Grytten, Hen, and Voll to form the new Rauma Municipality.

Government
All municipalities in Norway, including Veøy, are responsible for primary education (through 10th grade), outpatient health services, senior citizen services, unemployment and other social services, zoning, economic development, and municipal roads.  The municipality is governed by a municipal council of elected representatives, which in turn elects a mayor.

Municipal council
The municipal council  of Veøy was made up of 21 representatives that were elected to four year terms.  The party breakdown of the final municipal council was as follows:

See also
List of former municipalities of Norway

References

Romsdal
Molde
Rauma, Norway
Former municipalities of Norway
1838 establishments in Norway
1964 disestablishments in Norway